Myrceugenia leptospermoides is a species of small evergreen tree or large shrub in the genus Myrceugenia of the family Myrtaceae. It is commonly known as mocollo, murtilla del malo or chequen. It is endemic to central Chile where it is found in riverine habitats in the coastal mountain range at altitudes below .

Description
The bark is pale greyish-brown and the small leaves are in opposite pairs. The twigs are densely pubescent when they first grow but soon lose their hairs. They are greyish-green above and yellowish-green below, with a fairly prominent midrib on the underside. The flowers, which grow in the axils of the leaves, are solitary and have short stems. The calyx lobes are sometimes hairy and the six petals are white. In the centre of the flower there is a boss of sixty to ninety stamens and a single style. The flowering period is February to March and the fruits ripen in July and August.

Distribution and habitat
Myrceugenia leptospermoides is endemic to the coastal area of Chile. It is found from Ñuble Region southwards to Cautín Province. Its typical habitat is in wet or misty locations and it is often found growing with other undergrowth shrubs, near rivers and lakes or on damp forested slopes. It is an uncommon species and its conservation status is considered to be "endangered".

References

Trees of Chile
leptospermoides
Endemic flora of Chile